Crispy kangkong, also called kangkong chips, is a crispy deep-fried Filipino appetizer made with water spinach (kangkong) leaves coated with an egg and flour batter. It is eaten dipped in various sawsawan dipping sauces or mayonnaise. A vegetarian or vegan version of the dish can also be made by removing the egg component.

A variant of the dish is crispy kamote leaves made with the young edible leaves (talbos ng kamote) of the related sweet potato.

See also
Yasai tempura
Kakiage
Okoy
Stir fried water spinach

References

External links

Deep fried foods
Appetizers
Philippine cuisine
Philippine snack food
Vegetarian dishes of the Philippines